Cloud platform may refer to:

Computing
 Google Cloud Platform
 a platform for Cloud computing
 Oracle Cloud Platform
 Fujitsu Global Cloud Platform
 Xen Cloud Platform
 NIWA Cloud Application Platform

Places
 Cloud Platform at Juyongguan, a 14th-century Buddhist structure at Beijing, China